Alastair Duncan may refer to:

 Alastair Duncan (actor, born 1926) (1926–2005), English/Australian actor
 Alastair Duncan (actor, born 1958), Scottish actor
 Alastair Duncan (British Army officer) (1952–2016), British Army general

See also
 Alasdair Duncan (born 1982), Australian author and journalist